Murat Ülker (born 1959) is a Turkish billionaire businessman, and the chairman of Yıldız Holding, the largest food company in the CEEMEA Region (Central & Eastern Europe, Middle East, and Africa). Yıldız owns businesses including Godiva Chocolatier, pladis, and Sok.

Early life and education
Murat Ülker was born to Sabri Ülker and Güzide İman on 21 March 1959 in Istanbul, Turkey. He attended high school at İstanbul Erkek Lisesi and graduated from Boğaziçi University with a degree in business administration. In 1982, he studied abroad at the American Institute of Baking (AIB) and Zentralfachschule der Deutschen Süßwarenwirtschaft (ZDS) and trained at Continental Baking Company in the United States. He also worked on various International Executive Service Corps projects.

Career
In 1984, Ülker joined the Ülker Group, part of Yıldız Holding, as a control coordinator. Over the following years, he served as assistant general manager for enterprises, and later, as general manager.

In 2000, Ülker became the CEO of Yıldız Holding, before becoming its chairman in 2008. Under his chairmanship, Yıldız Holding expanded its business and made several acquisitions including GODIVA Chocolatier in 2008 and United Biscuits in 2014. In 2016, Yildiz formed a new global business, pladis, by bringing together three of its brands: Ülker, United Biscuits, and DeMet’s Candy Company.

Philanthropy 
In 2009, the Ülker family established the Sabri Ulker Foundation to make a lasting contribution to public health around the areas of food and nutrition.

In 2014, the Ülker family contributed $24 million to Harvard University. The funding, distributed over 10 years, was provided to establish The Sabri Ülker Center for Nutrient, Genetic, and Metabolic Research at the T.H. Chan School of Public Health. The center addresses chronic and complex diseases to help millions of people with illnesses such as diabetes and cardiovascular disease.

Personal life
Ülker is married, with three children, and lives in Istanbul.

He is an art collector. In 2012, Ülker sponsored the retrospective art exhibition "Fifty Years of Urban Walls" at Istanbul Modern which attracted 215,000 visitors with 120 works by Burhan Dogançay.

Ülker aided in the foundation of the Ülkerspor basketball club in 1993, which later became Fenerbahçe Ülker. The club has won the league championship four times, the Presidential Cup six times, and the Turkish Cup three times. Ülkerspor also reached the quarterfinals of the FIBA European Champions Cup as well as the FIBA Korać Cup. Ülker purchased the naming rights of the Fenerbahçe Şükrü Saracoğlu Stadium for ten years. He has also sponsored the Ülker Sports Arena. Ülker previously supported other football clubs as well, but later withdrew his sponsorship.

In 2018, Ülker was named the richest businessperson in Turkey with a net worth of $4.8 billion.

References 

1959 births
Living people
Businesspeople from Istanbul
Turkish billionaires
Turkish people of Crimean Tatar descent
Boğaziçi University alumni